The Outlets were a 1980s Boston rock band, consisting of David Alex Barton on vocals, his brother Rick Barton on lead guitar, Mike White on bass and Walter Gustafson on drums.

History
An acclaimed live band, The Outlets attained success in the greater Boston music scene but failed to gain national attention when they signed with Restless/Enigma in 1985, despite modest critical acclaim including a recommendation from Billboard. They are best known for the single "Knock Me Down", a regional hit. David Alex Barton reunited The Outlets in the late 1990s. The band reunited again in 2005. Barton's son, Charlie Alex-Barton, plays in the bands Call of Decency and Altitude Zero, bands which originated at the Fenn School. Alex-Barton also records under the stage name No Complaints.

Barton's brother, Rick went on to be a founding member of Dropkick Murphys, though he has subsequently left the group.  Following a stint with Everybody Out, Rick has been playing with Continental.  Walter Gustafson's post-Outlets resume includes several tours drumming for Gang Green as well as stints with The Freeze, Smegma and The Nunz, Mallet Head, DAMM and Nervous Eaters. Today he plays with Mung and Con-Sole.

Barton boys' cousin, the Somerville, Massachusetts guitarist/songwriter, Bill Trudell, co-wrote many Outlets songs, and helped define The Outlets' early sound. Trudell released a collection of songs entitled Pleasure Package in June 2008.

Much of The Outlets back catalog now resides at Fervor Records.

Discography

Albums 
Whole New World Restless/Enigma (1985)
I Remember (compilation) (1999)
The Outlets (2000) (new and re-recorded songs)
The Outlets Rock 1980 (2007) (new recordings of their 1980 setlist plus original 7" recordings: Best Friends, Bright Lights, Knock Me Down)
Bright Lights (2013) (EP)

Singles 
Boy's Life vs. The Outlets  (1980)
Split with Boys Life, features "Knock Me Down" and "You Told Me"
"Best Friends b/w Bright Lights" 7" (1981)
"Sheila" b/w "Valentine's Song" 7" (1985)
"If I Were the One" b/w "Can't Cheat the Reaper" 7" (1985)

Compilation appearances 
"3rd Floor" (from We Had a Wicked Good Time compilation) (1981)
"Not Too Late" (from Let's Breed! compilation) (1984)
"Tilted Track" (from Restless Variations compilation) (1986)
"Eddie" (from A Fistful of Hits compilation) (1987)
"Knock Me Down" (from DIY: Mass. Ave. - The Boston Scene compilation) (1993)
"Eddie" (live) & "Wait" (live) (from Ive Got My Friends'' compilation) (1996)

TV and Film

References

External links
The Outlets official web site
The Outlets official Myspace page
Fan page celebrating The Outlets
David Alex-Barton new music

Rock music groups from Massachusetts
Musical groups from Boston
Restless Records artists
Enigma Records artists